Thwaites's skink (Chalcidoseps thwaitesi), also known commonly as the fourtoe snakeskink, is a species of skink, a lizard in the family Scincidae. The species is endemic to the island of Sri Lanka.

Etymology
The specific name, thwaitesi, is in honor of English botanist George Henry Kendrick Thwaites.

Taxonomy
C. thwaitesi is the only species in the monotypic genus Chalcidoseps.

Habitat and geographic range

Description
C. thwaitesi has small eyes with scaly lower eyelids. The midbody scales are smooth, in 24-26 rows. The body and tail are elongate, and the tail is as wide as the body. The limbs are short and rudimentary, each bearing four toes, the inner two toes being short. The dorsum is dark brown, with a blackish-brown central region.

Ecology
In many places, C. thwaitesi lives in sympatry with skinks of the genera Nessia and Lankascincus.

Diet
The diet of C. thwaitesi comprises insects.

Reproduction
C. thwaitesi is oviparous. In April an adult female may lay a clutch of two eggs, each egg  measuring 6–11 mm x 18 mm (.33 x .71 inch).

References

External links
https://web.archive.org/web/20150220085810/http://www.srilankanreptiles.com/TetrapodReptiles/Scincidae.html
http://www.srisalike.com/Founa/Reptiles/Native/Chalcidoseps%20thwaitesii.aspx

Further reading
Boulenger GA (1887). Catalogue of the Lizards in the British Museum (Natural History). Second Edition. Volume III. ... Scincidæ ... London: Trustees of the British Museum (Natural History). (Taylor and Francis, printers). xii + 575 pp. + Plates I-XL. (Chalcidoseps, new genus, p. 423; "Chalcidoseps thwaitesii [sic]", new combination, pp. 423–424 + Plate XXXVIII, figures 1, 1a, 1b).
Boulenger GA (1890). The Fauna of British India, Including Ceylon and Burma. Reptilia and Batrachia. London: Secretary of State for India in Council. (Taylor and Francis, printers). xviii + 541 pp. (Genus Chalcidoseps, p. 226; "Chalcidoseps thwaitesii [sic]", p. 226, Figure 62).
Günther A (1872). "Descriptions of some Ceylonese Reptiles and Batrachians". Annals and Magazine of Natural History, Fourth Series 9: 85-88. ("Nessia Thwaitesii [sic]", new species, p. 86).
Smith MA (1935). The Fauna of British India, Including Ceylon and Burma. Reptilia and Amphibia. Vol. II.—Sauria. London: Secretary of State for India in Council. (Taylor and Francis, printers). xiii + 440 pp. + Plate I + 2 maps. (Genus Chalcidoseps, pp. 354–355; Chalcidoseps thwaitesi, pp. 355–356, Figure 83).
Taylor EH (1950). "Ceylonese Lizards of the Family Scincidae". University of Kansas Science Bulletin 33 (2): 481-518. (Genus Chalcidoseps, p. 507; Chalcidoseps thwaitesi, p. 508).

Reptiles of Sri Lanka
Skinks
Reptiles described in 1872
Taxa named by Albert Günther